The Glasgow Literary Society (GLS) was founded in 1753, as a forum for intellectual discussions and debates. It met every Thursday from November to May. It was associated with the University of Glasgow and the Glasgow tobacco lords.

Along with the University, the Foulis press and the Foulis Academy, the Literary Society was a key institution of the Enlightenment in Glasgow.

Over time the Society developed an orientation towards scientific and technological topics, and shortly after 1800 it became the Literary and Commercial Society of Glasgow, with great input from the staff of Anderson's Institution.

The last recorded references to the Literary and Commercial Society of Glasgow were 2 pamphlets published by Thomas Atkinson in 1831, and the Society is thought to have dissolved shortly after that date.

Notable members
 John Anderson
 Archibald Arthur
 Joseph Black
 Thomas Chalmers
 William Cullen
 David Hume 
 William Meikleham
 John Millar
 George Muirhead
 James Mylne
 Robert Owen
 Thomas Reid
 William Richardson
 John Robison
 Adam Smith (a founding member)
 Andrew Ure
 James Watt
 Alexander Wilson
 Patrick Wilson

References

Organizations established in 1753
1753 in Great Britain
18th century in Scotland
Scottish Enlightenment
Organisations based in Glasgow
University of Glasgow
University of Strathclyde
History of Glasgow
Science and technology in Glasgow
1831 disestablishments in Scotland
1753 establishments in Scotland
Literary societies